Umm Farwa bint al-Qāsim or Umm Farwa Fāṭima was the wife of Muhammad al-Baqir, and the mother of the sixth Imam, Ja'far al-Sadiq.

Family 
Umm Farwa's father was the Islamic jurist Al-Qasim, son of Muhammad ibn Abi Bakr. Her mother was Asma, daughter of Abd al-Rahman ibn Abi Bakr. Umm Farwa was therefore a great-granddaughter of Abu Bakr, the first Rashidun Caliph, twice-over. She also had another son named Abd Allah ibn Muhammad al-Baqir.

Knowledge 
She is a notable woman for her knowledge in Islamic history. She is among the Imamiyyat (the women of the Ahl al-Bayt and the companions of the Imams) narrators of the hadith and narrated on the authority of Imam Ali ibn Husayn Zayn al-Abidin.

Ancestry

References

Salaf
8th-century Arabs
Wives of Shiite Imams
Burials at Jannat al-Baqī
Women from the Umayyad Caliphate